General elections were held in Honduras to elect a president and parliament on 25 November 2001. Ricardo Maduro of the National Party was elected president with over 50% of the vote, while the National Party emerged as the largest party in the National Congress, winning 61 of the 128 seats.

Results

President

National Congress

References

Elections in Honduras
Honduras
2001 in Honduras
Presidential elections in Honduras
Honduras